Mário Goulart Lino (born 9 January 1937) is a former Portuguese footballer who played as right back and manager.

Career
Mário Lino began playing football with Faial and S.C. Lusitânia before starring with Sporting Clube de Portugal.

References

External links
 
 

1937 births
Living people
People from Faial Island
Portuguese footballers
Association football defenders
Primeira Liga players
Segunda Divisão players
S.C. Lusitânia players
Sporting CP footballers
Portugal international footballers
Portuguese football managers
Sporting CP managers
Vitória F.C. managers
S.C. Braga managers
Boavista F.C. managers
C.S. Marítimo managers
S.C. Olhanense managers
S.C. Beira-Mar managers